Harmony is a 2010 South Korean film starring Kim Yunjin and Na Moon-hee about a group of women in prison who start a choir.

It sold 3,045,009 tickets, making it the 5th best selling film of the year in Korea.

Plot
Hong Jeong-hye is sentenced to serve 10 years in prison after killing her abusive husband. Pregnant at the time of her arrest, she gives birth to a baby boy behind bars but must give him up for adoption according to the law.

One day she sets out to start a choir with the help of Kim Moon-ok, a fellow inmate on death row for killing her adulterous husband and mistress. The prison chief promises her a special outing with her baby if she succeeds.

Cast

 Kim Yunjin as Hong Jeong-hye
 Na Moon-hee as Kim Moon-ok
 Kang Ye-won as Kang Yu-mi
 Jang Young-nam as Section chief Bang 
 Lee Da-hee as Kong Na-yeong
 Jung Soo-young as Ji Hwa-ja
 Park Jun-myeon as Kang Yeon-sil
 Cha Jin-hyeok as Hyeon-wook
 Ji Sung-won as Hyeon-joo
 Do Yong-gu as school director
 Park Hye-jin as Yu-mi's mother
 Jeong Do-gyu as Yu-mi's adoptive father
 Kim Jae-hwa as Harmony Choir, Kwon-dal woman
 Kim Hyeon-ah as Harmony Choir, Fraudulent marriage
 Lee Do-hyeon as Jeong-hye's husband
 Lee Seung-yeon as young Kim Moon-ok
 Jeon Su-ji as teaching assistant Kang
 Moon Kyung-min as prison warden
 Lee Do-ah as "Glue ring"
 Lee Jun-hyeok as doctor in emergency room
 Cha Chung-hwa as Harmony Choir, chase woman
 Son Chae-bin as Harmony Choir, school gate

Awards and nominations

References

External links
 https://web.archive.org/web/20120910155446/http://www.harmony2010.co.kr/ 
 Harmony at Naver 
 
 
 

2010 films
2010 drama films
2010s musical drama films
2010s pregnancy films
South Korean musical drama films
South Korean prison films
CJ Entertainment films
Women in prison films
Mariticide in fiction
2010s South Korean films